The Dealer from Amsterdam (German: Der Trödler von Amsterdam) is a 1925 German silent film directed by Victor Janson and starring Werner Krauss, Hilde Hildebrand and Harry Hardt. It was made by the German subsidiary of the Fox Film Company.

The film's art direction was by Andrej Andrejew and Gustav A. Knauer

Cast
Werner Krauss as Arent Bergh  
Hilde Hildebrand as Susi 
Alf Blütecher as Oliver Morrisson  
Harry Hardt as Ernst  
Diomira Jacobini as Annette Bergh  
Hans Mierendorff 
Anton Pointner as Gilbert

References

External links

Films of the Weimar Republic
German silent feature films
Films directed by Victor Janson
German black-and-white films